13732 Woodall, provisional designation , is a stony Vestian asteroid from the inner regions of the asteroid belt, approximately 4 kilometers in diameter. It was discovered on 14 September 1998, by the Lincoln Near-Earth Asteroid Research (LINEAR) team at Lincoln Laboratory's Experimental Test Site in Socorro, New Mexico.

Orbit and classification 

Woodall is a member of the Vesta family, which is named after 4 Vesta, the second-largest asteroid in the main-belt. It orbits the Sun in the inner main-belt at a distance of 2.1–2.6 AU once every 3 years and 8 months (1,336 days). Its orbit has an eccentricity of 0.10 and an inclination of 6° with respect to the ecliptic. The first precovery was taken at Siding Spring Observatory in 1989, extending the asteroid's observation arc by 9 years prior to its official discovery observation.

Physical characteristics 

Woodall has been characterized as a common S-type asteroid by Pan-STARRS photometric survey.

A rotational lightcurve was obtained based on photometric observations by Czech astronomer Petr Pravec at the Ondřejov Observatory in September 2009.

The Collaborative Asteroid Lightcurve Link assumes a standard albedo for stony asteroids of 0.20 and calculates a diameter of 3.9 kilometers with an absolute magnitude of 14.4.

Naming 

This minor planet was named after Ashley Renee Woodall (born 1987) student at the U.S. Austin Academy for Excellence in Garland, Texas. In 2002, she was a finalist of the Discovery Channel Young Scientist Challenge (DCYSC), a science and engineering competition. The approved naming citation was published by the Minor Planet Center on 21 October 2002.

References

External links 
 Nature, Formation of asteroid pairs by rotational fission (26 August 2010)
 Asteroid Lightcurve Database (LCDB), query form (info )
 Dictionary of Minor Planet Names, Google books
 Asteroids and comets rotation curves, CdR – Observatoire de Genève, Raoul Behrend
 Discovery Circumstances: Numbered Minor Planets (10001)-(15000) – Minor Planet Center
 
 

013732
013732
Named minor planets
19980914